Édouard-Jules Corroyer (14 September 1835, Amiens – 30 January 1904, Paris) was a French architect and restorer.

Biography 
He came from a family that was involved in the building trades. His father was a carpenter, and his grandfather was a slater. After completing his secondary education, he became a student of the architect, Eugène Viollet-le-Duc.

Later, he developed an interest in Medieval architecture, and was an active participant in the restoration of Soissons Cathedral. In 1871, he was attached to the Commission of Historical Monuments. While working there he brought his maid, Anne Boutiaut Poulard, who later opened a restaurant and created the famous "Omelette de la mère Poulard". 

From 1878 to 1882, he was also involved in supervising construction at the headquarters of the Comptoir d'Escompte de Paris; work which earned him the title of Knight in the Legion of Honor. He obtained the post of Inspector General of Diocesan Buildings in 1885. During these years, he was also an architecture critic for the Gazette des Beaux-Arts.

In 1886, following the departure of Honoré Daumet, he was a competitor for completing construction of the Sacré-Cœur Basilica, but was not chosen. Two years later, he was removed from the project at Mont-Saint-Michel, and replaced by Victor Petitgrand (1842–1898). Over the next three years, he published his works, L'Architecture Romane and L'Architecture Gothique.

In 1896, he was elected a member of the Académie des Beaux-Arts, taking Seat #10 in the "Unattached" section.

References

Further reading 
 Henri Bouchot, Notice sur la vie et les œuvres de M. Édouard Corroyer, Institut de France, Académie des beaux-arts, Paris : Firmin-Didot, 1905

External links

 Jean-Michel Leniaud (Ed.), Biography of Corroyer, from the Répertoire des architectes diocésains du XIXe siècle, (Online)
 Biographical timeline, references, and a critical essay by Marie Gloc @ the Institut National d'Histoire de l'Art
 Career summary @ La compagnie des Architectes en Chef des Monuments Historiques

1835 births
1904 deaths
French architects
French architectural historians
Recipients of the Legion of Honour
Members of the Académie des beaux-arts
People from Amiens